The 1998–99 Slovak Cup was the 30th season of Slovakia's annual knock-out cup competition and the sixth since the independence of Slovakia. It began on 29 July 1998 with Preliminary round and ended on 8 May 1999 with the Final. The winners of the competition earned a place in the first round of the UEFA Cup. Spartak Trnava were the defending champions.

Preliminary round
The first legs were played on 29 July 1998. The second legs were played on 12 August 1998.

|}

First round
The games were played on 8 September 1998, except for the match ŠKP Devín – Artmedia Petržalka, which was played on 9 September 1998.

|}

Second round
The games were played on 22 September 1998, except for the match Spartak Trnava – Baník Prievidza, which was played on 23 September 1998.

|}

Quarter-finals
The games were played on 27 October 1998.

|}

Semi-finals
The first legs were played on 16 March 1999. The second legs were played on 6 April 1999.

|}

Final

References

External links
profutbal.sk 
Results on RSSSF

Slovak Cup seasons
Slovak Cup
Cup